Daniel Attah (born 20 November 1978) is a Nigerian former professional boxer who challenged for the WBA (Super) and WBO super featherweight titles in 2002. As an amateur, he competed in the men's featherweight event at the 1996 Summer Olympics.

Attah lost to Acelino Freitas in 12 rounds, by a unanimous decision in a world championship fight held at Phoenix, Arizona. As of 2022, he is a resident of Washington, D.C.

References

External links
 

1978 births
Living people
Nigerian male boxers
Olympic boxers of Nigeria
Boxers at the 1996 Summer Olympics
Commonwealth Games competitors for Nigeria
Boxers at the 1994 Commonwealth Games
People from Calabar
Super-featherweight boxers
Featherweight boxers